The subjective theory of value is an economic theory which proposes the idea that the value of any good is not determined by the utility value of the object, nor by the cumulative value of components or labour needed to produce or manufacture it, but instead is determined by the individuals or entities who are buying or selling the object in question. This trend is often seen in collectable items such as cars, vinyl records, and comic books. The value of an object may have increased substantially since its creation or original purchase due to age, a personal affinity, or scarcity.

The modern version of this theory was created independently and nearly simultaneously by William Stanley Jevons, Léon Walras, and Carl Menger in the late 19th century.

Overview
According to the subjective theory of value, by assuming that all trades between individuals are voluntary, it can be concluded that both parties to the trade subjectively perceive the goods, labour or money they receive, as being of higher value to the goods, labour or money they give away. The theory holds that one can create value simply by trading with someone who values the items higher, without necessarily modifying those. Wealth is understood to refer to individuals' subjective valuation of their possessions, and voluntary trades may increase the total wealth in society. This suggests that items cannot be objectively valued as any value placed upon the item is only correct if both buyer and seller agree on the price and a transaction takes place. A seller may value an item in their possession higher than any buyer will value it leading to either a price reduction until the item's price equals a buyer's value of the item, or the seller will continue to value the item higher than any buyer and no transaction will occur.

Individuals will experience more radical improvements to life and satisfaction from acquiring the first unit of a good compared to the marginal utility from acquiring additional units of a good. They will initially prioritise obtaining the goods they most need (of central, not marginal utility), such as essential food, but once their need for it is satisfied up to a certain level, their desire for other luxury or surplus goods will begin to rise, and the satisfaction obtained from the original essential goods will diminish.

Proponents of the theory also believe that in a free market, competition between individuals seeking to trade goods they possess and services they can provide for goods they perceive as being of higher value to them results in a market equilibrium set of prices emerging. This occurs during auctions. Bidders are able to express their belief in the value of each item via bids. As each person raises their bid, the value of the item rises even though the nature and function of the item has not changed. This behaviour can lead to Winner's curse.

Labour theory of value 

Classical economists such as David Ricardo proposed a labour theory of value that states there is a direct correlation between the value of a good and the labour required to produce the good, concluding "The value of a commodity, or the quantity of any other commodity for which it will exchange, depends on the relative quantity of labour which is necessary for its production, and not on the greater or less compensation which is paid for that labour." Ricardo clarified that this correlation did not effectively connect those with market prices, or 'value in exchange', seeing them as separately derived from the quantity of labour input and other production factors. Increasing wages would not necessarily cause price rises, but conversely price rises may not cause wages to increase.

Carl Menger argued that production was simply another case of the theory of marginal utility, and that labourers' wage-earning potential is set by the value of their work to others rather than subsistence costs, and they work because they value remuneration more highly than inactivity.

Diamond-water paradox 

The development of the subjective theory of value was partly motivated by the need to solve the value-paradox which had puzzled many classical economists such as Adam Smith and John Law. This theory, known as the diamond-water paradox, states that although water is more essential to survival and provides far more utility value, diamonds are valued a lot higher in the market. This paradox arose when value was attributed to things such as the amount of labor that went into the production of a good or alternatively to an objective measure of the usefulness of a good.

The subjective theory of value presents a solution to this paradox by arguing that value is not determined by individuals choosing among entire abstract classes of goods, such as all the water in the world versus all the diamonds in the world. Rather, an acting individual is faced with the choice between definite quantities of goods, and the choice made by such an actor is determined by which good of a specified quantity will satisfy the individual's highest subjectively ranked preference, or most desired end. Water is very abundant, therefore its marginal utility is not that high, despite its important function in keeping organisms alive.

See also
 Behavioral economics
 Expected utility hypothesis
 Intrinsic theory of value
 Labour theory of value
 Marginalism
 Power theory of value

References

Theory of value (economics)
Subjectivism
Utility